Nigerian chieftaincy may refer to:

 The Nigerian Chieftaincy, the chieftaincy system that is native to Nigeria
 An individual title of authority or title of honour in the aforesaid system